Hüseyin Emre Sakçı (born 15 November 1997) is a Turkish swimmer specialized in breaststroke. Sakçı holds the short-course world record in 50 meters breaststroke (24.95), the European record for 100 meters breaststroke (55.74), Turkish short-course records in 50 meters freestyle, 100 meters freestyle, 200 meters freestyle, 50 meters breaststroke, 100 meters breaststroke, 100 meters individual medley as well as long-course records in 50 meters freestyle, 50 meters breaststroke and 100 meters breaststroke.

In a first ever for Turkish swimming, Sakçı won the silver medal in the 2019 European Short Course Championship in the 50 meter breaststroke with a time of 25.82 seconds. Subsequently, Sakçı broke the short-course European record in 50 meters breaststroke with a time of 25.50 seconds on 26 October 2020 during the 2020 ISL (International Swimming League) races making him the only Turkish swimmer ever to break a European record in any stroke that is not in the junior category. Sakçı further advanced his European Short Course 50 meter breaststroke record on 5 November 2020 again during the ISL competitions, only 0.04 seconds off the World record.  Sakçı added a third European short-course record, this time in 100 meters breaststroke, with a time of 55.74, .13 seconds off the World record. Sakçı qualified for 2020 Tokyo Olympics with Olympic A qualification standard time in 100 meters breaststroke. Sakçı belongs to a new generation of Turkish swimmers that have solely trained in Turkey instead of going to the US for college as was done in the past by successful Turkish swimmers. Sakçı trains in his hometown of İzmir with his coach Türker Oktay.

References

External links
 

1997 births
Living people
Swimmers at the 2015 European Games
Swimmers at the 2018 Mediterranean Games
Swimmers at the 2022 Mediterranean Games
Mediterranean Games silver medalists for Turkey
Mediterranean Games bronze medalists for Turkey
Mediterranean Games medalists in swimming
European Games competitors for Turkey
Turkish male freestyle swimmers
Turkish male breaststroke swimmers
Swimmers at the 2020 Summer Olympics
Olympic swimmers of Turkey
20th-century Turkish people
21st-century Turkish people
Islamic Solidarity Games competitors for Turkey
Islamic Solidarity Games medalists in swimming